The Wasatch Formation (Tw) is an extensive highly fossiliferous geologic formation stretching across several basins in Idaho, Montana Wyoming, Utah and western Colorado. It preserves fossils dating back to the Early Eocene period. The formation defines the Wasatchian or Lostcabinian (55.8 to 50.3 Ma), a period of time used within the NALMA classification, but the formation ranges in age from the Clarkforkian (56.8 to 55.8 Ma) to Bridgerian (50.3 to 46.2 Ma).

Wasatch fauna consists of many groups of mammals, including numerous genera of primates, artiodactyls, perissodactyls, rodents, carnivora, insectivora, hyaenodonta and others. A number of birds, several reptiles and fish and invertebrates complete the diverse faunal assemblages. Fossil flora and ichnofossils also have been recovered from the formation.

The formation, first named as Wasatch Group in 1873 by Ferdinand Vandeveer Hayden, was deposited in alluvial, fluvial and lacustrine environments and comprises sandstones, siltstones, mudstones and shales with coal or lignite beds representing wet floodplain settings.

The Wasatch Formation is an unconventional tight gas reservoir formation in the Uinta and Piceance Basins of Utah and the coal seams of the formation are mined in Wyoming. At the Fossil Butte National Monument, the formation crops out underlying the Green River Formation. In the Silt Quadrangle of Garfield County, Colorado, the formation overlies the Williams Fork Formation.

Description

Definition 
The Wasatch Formation was first named as the Wasatch Group by Ferdinand Vandeveer Hayden in the 1873 edition of his original 1869 publication titled "Preliminary field report of the United States Geological Survey of Colorado and New Mexico: U.S. Geological and Geographical Survey of the Territories", based on sections in the Echo and Weber Canyons, of the Wasatch Mountains. In the language of the native Ute people, Wasatch means "mountain pass" or "low pass over high range." According to William Bright, the mountains were named for a Shoshoni leader who was named with the Shoshoni term wasattsi, meaning "blue heron".

Outcrops 

At the base of Fossil Butte are the bright red, purple, yellow and gray beds of the Wasatch Formation. Eroded portions of these horizontal beds slope gradually upward from the valley floor and steepen abruptly. In the Silt Quadrangle of Garfield County, Colorado, the formation overlies the Williams Fork Formation. The formation is exposed in the Desolation and Gray Canyons pertaining to the Colorado Plateau in northeastern Utah, and in Flaming Gorge National Recreation Area at the border of southwestern Wyoming and northeastern Utah.

Extent 

The Wasatch Formation is found across six states in the northwestern United States, from Montana and Idaho in the north across Utah and Wyoming to Colorado in the southwest. The formation is part of several geologic provinces; the eponymous Wasatch uplift, Uinta uplift, Green River, Piceance, Powder River, Uinta and Paradox Basins and the Colorado Plateau sedimentary province and Yellowstone province.

In Montana, the formation overlies the Fort Union Formation and is overlain by the White River Formation. There is a regional, angular unconformity between the Fort Union and Wasatch Formations in the northern portion of the Powder River Basin.

Subdivision 

Many local subdivisions of the formation exist, the following members have been named in the literature:

Lithologies and facies 
In the Fossil Basin at the Fossil Butte National Monument, Wyoming, the Wasatch Formation consists primarily of brightly variegated mudstones with subordinate interbedded siltstones, sandstones, and conglomerates and represents deposition on an intermontane alluvial plain. In Mesa County, Colorado, the formation comprises interbedded purple, lavender, red, and gray claystones and shales with local lenses of gray and brown sandstones, conglomeratic sandstones, and volcanic sandstones that are predominantly fluvial and lacustrine in origin. Along the western margin of the Powder River Basin, the Wasatch Formation contains two thick conglomeratic members (in descending order, the Moncrief Member and Kingsbury Conglomerate Member).

The Molina Member of the formation is a zone of distinctly sandier fluvial strata. The over- and underlying members of the Molina are the Atwell Gulch and Shire members, respectively. These members consist of infrequent lenses of fluvial-channel sandstones interbedded within thick units of variegated red, orange, purple and gray overbank and paleosol mudstones.

The Molina Member represents a sudden change in the tectonic and/or climatic regimes, that caused an influx of laterally-continuous, fine, coarse and locally conglomeratic sands into the basin. The benches are cut by
canyons or "gulches", from which the Atwell Gulch and Shire Gulch members get their names. The Molina forms the principle target within the Wasatch Formation for natural gas exploration, although it is usually called the "G sandstone" in the subsurface.

Provenance 
The detrital zircon age spectrum ranged from 1433-2957 Ma in age, and consisted of more than 95% Archean age grains, with an age peak of about 2900 Ma. The 2900 Ma age peak is consistent with the age of Archean rocks at the core of the Bighorn Mountains. The sparse Proterozoic grains were likely derived from the recycling of Paleozoic sandstone units. The analysis concluded that the Wasatch sandstone is a first cycle sediment, the Archean core of the Bighorn uplift was exposed and shedding sediment into the Powder River Basin during time of deposition of the Wasatch Formation and the Powder River Basin Wasatch detrital zircon age spectra are distinct from the coeval Willwood Formation in the Bighorn Basin west of the Bighorn Mountains. Cobbles and pebbles in the Wasatch are rich in feldspathic rock fragments, with individual samples containing as much as 40 percent, derived from erosion of the Precambrian core of the Bighorn Mountains. Part of the feldspar has been replaced by calcite cement. Glauconite is present in the Wasatch, although always in volumes of less than
1 percent of the grains. It most probably was derived from the nearby, friable, glauconite-bearing Mesozoic strata of the eastern Bighorn Mountains.

The presence of the Kingsbury Conglomerate at the base of the Wasatch Formation indicates that tectonic activity in the immediate vicinity of the Powder River Basin was intensifying. The conglomerate consists of Mesozoic and Paleozoic rock fragments. The lack of Precambrian fragments indicates that the metamorphic core of the Bighorn Mountains had not been dissected by this early deformation. Deformation in the upper part of the formation has been interpreted as the result of the last phase of uplift during the Laramide orogeny.

Correlations 
The basal part of the Wasatch Formation is equivalent to the Flagstaff Formation in the southwest part of the Uinta Basin. The Wasatch Formation is correlated with the Sentinel Butte and Golden Valley Formations of the Williston Basin.

Paleontological significance 
The Wasatch Formation is the defining formation for the Wasatchian, ranging from 55.8 to 50.3 Ma, within the NALMA classification. The Wasatchian followed the Clarkforkian stage (56.8-55.8 Ma) and is defined by the simultaneous first appearance of adapid and omomyid euprimates, hyaenodontid creodonts, perissodactyls and artiodactyls. The deposits of the formation were laid down during a period of globally high temperatures during the Paleocene-Eocene Thermal Maximum (PETM).

At the Fossil Butte National Monument, the Wasatch Formation preserved ichnofossils attributed to arthropods and described as Lunulichnus tuberosus. Trace fossils are common within the upper part of the Main Body Member. These traces occur in three distinct alluvial depositional settings: flood basin/alluvial plain, crevasse splay, and fluvial channel. Flood basin deposits (dominated by alluvial paleosols with pronounced color variegation) are characterized by common Planolites, rare Skolithos and small, meniscate plug-shaped burrows, possibly Celliforma.

Crevasse splay deposits (current-rippled to planar laminated, fine-grained sandstone to siltstone) are characterized by a mixed assemblage of vertical (Arenicolites, Skolithos, unwalled sinuous shafts, shafts with discoidal lenses of sediment), sub-vertical (Camborygma and Thalassinoides) and horizontal (Scoyenia, Rusophycus, Taenidium, Planolites and Palaeophycus) burrows. Large, vertically oriented burrows (Camborygma, cf. Ophiomorpha, Spongeliomorpha and Thalassinoides) are the dominant forms within fluvial channel deposits.

Fossil content 
Among the following fossils have been found in the formation:

Mammals 
Primates

 Absarokius abbotti
 A. gazini
 Anaptomorphus aemulus
 Anemorhysis sublettensis
 Arapahovius gazini
 Artimonius nocerai
 A. witteri
 Cantius frugivorus
 C. mckennai
 C. nunienus
 Carpodaptes cf. hazelae
 Chiromyoides minor
 Chlororhysis knightensis
 Copelemur australotutus
 C. praetutus
 C. tutus
 Ignacius frugivorus
 Loveina minuta
 L. sheai
 L. zephyri
 Microsyops angustidens
 M. knightensis
 M. latidens
 M. cf. elegans
 M. cf. scottianus
 Notharctus robinsoni
 N. venticolus
 Omomys carteri
 O. lloydi
 Plesiadapis dubius
 Plesiadapis cf. cookei
 Plesiadapis cf. rex
 Simpsonlemur cf. jepseni
 Smilodectes sororis
 Steinius cf. vespertinus
 Tetonius matthewi
 Tetonoides pearcei
 cf. Trogolemur myodes
 Uintanius rutherfurdi
 Utahia carina
 Walshina mcgrewi
 Washakius insignis
 W. izetti
 cf. Choctawius sp.
 Cantius sp.
 Carpolestes sp.
 Chlororhysis sp.
 Loveina sp.
 Microsyops sp.
 Notharctus sp.
 Omomys sp.
 Phenacolemur sp.
 Picrodus sp.
 Tetonius sp.
 Trogolemur sp.
 Uintasorex sp.
 Phenacolemurinae indet.

Artiodactyls

 Antiacodon pygmaeus
 Bunophorus cf. etsagicus
 B. grangeri
 B. macropternus
 B. sinclairi
 Diacodexis secans
 Gagadon minimonstrum
 Hexacodus pelodes
 H. uintensis
 Antiacodon sp.
 Bunophorus sp.
 Diacodexis sp.
 Hexacodus sp.
 Microsus sp.
 Dichobunidae indet.

Perissodactyls

 Arenahippus pernix
 Cardiolophus semihians
 cf. Dilophodon destitutus
 Eotitanops borealis
 Heptodon calciculus
 H. posticus
 Homogalax protapirinus
 Hyrachyus modestus
 Hyracotherium vasacciense
 Lambdotherium popoagicum
 Minippus index
 Orohippus proteros
 Orohippus cf. pumilus
 Palaeosyops fontinalis
 Protorohippus venticolum
 Xenicohippus craspedotum
 Eotitanops borealis
 Helaletes sp.
 Heptodon sp.
 Homogalax sp.
 Hyrachyus sp.
 Hyracotherium sp.
 Lambdotherium sp.
 Orohippus sp.
 Palaeosyops sp.
 Equidae indet.
 Helaletidae indet.
 Isectolophidae indet.
 Perissodactyla indet.
 Tapiroidea indet.

Hyaenodonta

 Gazinocyon vulpeculus
 Iridodon datzae
 Prolimnocyon antiquus
 Prototomus secundarius
 Tritemnodon cf. strenuus
 Prolimnocyon sp.
 Sinopa sp.
 Thinocyon sp.
 Tritemnodon sp.
 Hyaenodontidae indet.

Acreodi

 Dissacus cf. praenuntius
 Hapalodectes leptognathus
 Pachyaena ossifraga
 Wyolestes dioctes
 Dissacus sp.
 ?Mesonyx sp.
 Mesonychidae indet.

Carnivora

 Miacis latidens
 Vulpavus australis
 V. canavus
 Miacis sp.
 Vulpavus sp.
 Miacidae indet.

Cimolesta

 Amaramnis gregoryi
 Esthonyx acutidens
 Esthonyx cf. bisulcatus
 Palaeoryctes cruoris
 Palaeoryctes cf. punctatus
 ?Trogosus cf. latidens
 Esthonyx sp.
 Trogosus sp.

Dinocerata

 cf. Bathyopsis fissidens
 Probathyopsis cf. harrisorum
 Bathyopsis sp.

Erinaceomorpha
 Adunator meizon

Eutheria

 Aceroryctes dulcis
 Arctocyon nexus
 Bessoecetor cf. septentrionalis
 Chriacus oconostotae
 Lambertocyon gingerichi
 Palaeosinopa incerta
 P. lacus
 Palaeosinopa cf. didelphoides
 cf. Palaeosinopa lutreola
 Thryptacodon australis
 T. pseudarctos
 Chriacus sp.
 Claenodon sp.

Ferae

 Ambloctonus major
 Brachianodon westorum
 Didymictis altidens
 D. cf. protenus
 Oxyaena forcipata
 O. lupina
 Protictis agastor
 P. paralus
 Raphictis cf. gausion
 Tubulodon pearcei
 Tytthaena parrisi
 Uintacyon asodes
 Viverravus cf. acutus
 V. gracilis
 V. lutosus
 V. minutus
 V. sicarius
 Didymictis sp.
 Patriofelis sp.
 Viverravus sp.

Glires

 Acritoparamys francesi
 Knightomys depressus
 K. huerfanensis
 Leptotomus parvus
 Lophiparamys murinus
 Microparamys hunterae
 M. minutus
 Mysops fraternus
 ?Notoparamys blochi
 Paramys copei
 P. delicatior
 P. delicatus
 P. excavatus
 P. taurus
 P. wyomingensis
 Pauromys schaubi
 Pseudotomus robustus
 Reithroparamys delicatissimus
 R. huerfanensis
 R. cf. debequensis
 Sciuravus bridgeri
 S. nitidus
 S. wilsoni
 Thisbemys perditus
 Tuscahomys ctenodactylops
 Microparamys sp.
 Paramys sp.
 Reithroparamys sp.
 Tillomys sp.
 Cylindrodontidae indet.
 Paramyidae indet.
 Rodentia indet.
 Sciuravidae indet.

Insectivora

 Apatemys bellulus
 A. bellus
 A. cf. whitakeri
 Labidolemur soricoides
 Unuchinia dysmathes
 Apatemys sp.

Leptictida

 Palaeictops cf. bicuspis
 Prodiacodon cf. concordiarcensis
 Prodiacodon cf. furor
 Prodiacodon cf. tauricinerei

Lipotyphla

 Cedrocherus aceratus
 Eoictops novaceki
 Entomolestes sp.
 Adapisoricinae indet.

Macroscelidea

 Aletodon cf. quadravus
 Apheliscus nitidus
 Apheliscus cf. insidiosus
 Dorraletes diminutivus
 Haplomylus speirianus
 Haplomylus cf. scottianus
 Litocherus lacunatus
 Scenopagus priscus
 Scenopagus sp.

Multituberculata

 Ectypodus cf. powelli
 Neoplagiaulax cf. hazeni
 Neoplagiaulax cf. hunteri
 Ptilodus kummae
 Mesodma sp.
 Ectypodus sp.
 Parectypodus sp.
 ?Prochetodon sp.
 Ptilodus sp.

Pantodonta

 Barylambda faberi
 Coryphodon armatus
 C. lobatus
 C. radians
 Coryphodon sp.

Pholidota
 Palaeanodon sp.

Placentalia

 Copecion brachypternus
 Ectocion collinus
 E. osbornianus
 E. superstes
 Hyopsodus loomisi
 H. minor
 H. minusculus
 H. paulus
 H. powellianus
 H. wortmani
 H. cf. mentalis
 H. cf. walcottianus
 Meniscotherium chamense
 M. cf. robustum
 M. cf. tapiacitum
 Phenacodus grangeri
 P. intermedius
 P. trilobatus
 P. vortmani
 Ectocion sp.
 Hyopsodus sp.
 Phenacodus sp.

Soricomorpha

 Leptacodon cf. munusculum
 Nyctitherium serotinum
 Leptacodon sp.
 Wyonycteris sp.

Taeniodonta
 Stylinodon mirus

Theriiformes

 Copedelphys innominata
 Herpetotherium knighti
 H. innominatum
 Peradectes elegans
 P. chesteri
 Peratherium edwardi
 P. marsupium
 Ectoganus sp.
 Oodectes sp.
 Paleotomus sp.
 Stylinodon sp.
 Uintacyon sp.
 Epoicotheriidae indet.
 Leptictidae indet.
 Marsupialia indet.
 Metacheiromyidae indet.
 Nyctitheriidae indet.
 Oxyaenidae indet.
 Pantolestidae indet.
 Stylinodontidae indet.

Birds 

 Eocrex primus
 Limnofregata hutchisoni
 Presbyornis sp.

Reptiles 

 Anosteira ornata
 Apodosauriscus minutus
 Arpadosaurus gazinorum
 A. sepulchralis
 Baena arenosa
 Boavus occidentalis
 Boverisuchus vorax
 Calamagras primus
 Dunnophis microechinus
 Echmatemys stevensoniana
 Echmatemys cf. cibollensis
 Emys wyomingensis
 Entomophontes incrustatus
 Eodiploglossus borealis
 cf. Eoglyptosaurus donohoei
 Glyptosaurus agmodon
 G. sylvestris
 Machaerosaurus torrejonensis
 Notomorpha testudinea
 Palaeoxantusia amara
 Palepidophyma lilliputiana
 Parasauromalus olseni
 Provaranosaurus fatuus
 Psilosemys wyomingensis
 Restes rugosus
 Saniwa ensidens
 Scincoideus grassator
 Suzanniwana revenanta
 Trionyx aequa
 Xenochelys lostcabinensis
 Xestops savagei
 X. vagans
 cf. Crocodylus affinis
 Allognathosuchus sp.
 Anolbanolis sp.
 Coniophis sp.
 Echmatemys sp.
 Tinosaurus sp.
 Palaeoxantusia sp.
 Paranolis sp.
 Parasauromalus sp.
 Procaimanoidea sp.
 Stylinodon sp.
 Suzanniwana sp.
 Tinosaurus sp.
 cf. Jepsibaena sp.
 cf. Restes sp.
 cf. Saniwa sp.
 Amphisbaenidae indet.
 Anguidae indet.
 Anguimorpha indet.
 Baenidae indet.
 Crocodylia indet.
 Crocodylidae indet.
 Emydidae indet.
 Gerrhonotinae indet.
 Glyptosaurinae indet.
 Helodermatidae indet.
 Iguania indet.
 Lacertilia indet.
 Squamata indet.
 Trionychidae indet.

Amphibians 
 Caudata indet.

Fish 

 Goniobasis carterii
 G. tenera
 Diplomystus sp.
 Lepisosteus sp.
 ?Notogoneus sp.
 Centrarchidae indet.
 aff. Amblyopsidae indet.
 Actinopterygii indet.

Invertebrates 
Bivalves

 Asimina vesperalis
 Davidia antiqua
 Unio wasatchensis

Gastropods

 Viviparus paludinaeformis
 Ferrissia cf. minuta

Mollusks
 Mollusca indet.

Flora 

 Allantodiopsis erosa
 Allophylus flexifolia
 Ampelopsis acerifolia
 Beringiaphyllum cupanioides
 Carya antiquorum
 Castanea intermedia
 Cercidiphyllum arcticum
 Cissus marginata
 Dillenites garfieldensis
 Dombeya novimundi
 Ficus artocarpoides
 Ficus planicostata
 Fraxinus eocenica
 Hovenia cf. oregonensis
 Metasequoia occidentalis
 Nyssa alata
 Osmunda greenlandica
 Penosphyllum cordatum
 Platanus raynoldsi
 Platycarya americana
 Populus wyomingiana
 Prunus corrugis
 Rhamnus goldiana
 cf. Schoepfia republicensis
 Stillingia casca
 Syzygioides americana
 Ternstroemites aureavallis
 Zizyphus fibrillosus
 Alnus sp.
 Celtis sp.
 Cinnamomophyllum sp.
 Sloanea sp.
 Apocynaceae indet.
 Dicotyledonae indet.
 Lauraceae indet.
 cf. Magnoliales indet.

Ichnofossils 

 Lunulichnus tuberosus
 Arenicolites
 Camborygma
 Celliforma
 Palaeophycus
 Planolites
 Rusophycus
 Scoyenia
 Skolithos
 Spongeliomorpha
 Taenidium
 Thalassinoides
 cf. Ophiomorpha

Herbivore expansion 
The mammal fauna of the formation is part of the fourth phase of herbivore expansion spanning about 115 Ma from the Aptian to Holocene, and correlated with the Wind River and Wilcox Formations of the United States and the Laguna del Hunco Formation of Argentina.

Economic geology

Petroleum geology 
The Wasatch Formation is a tight gas reservoir rock in the Greater Natural Buttes Field in the Uinta Basin of Utah and Colorado. The formation is characterized by porosity ranging from 6 to 20% and permeability of up to 1 mD. Based on 409 samples from the Wasatch Formation, average porosity is 8.75 percent and average permeability is 0.095 mD. The production rates after 2 years are 100–1,000 mscf/day for gas, 0.35–3.4 barrel per day for oil, and less than 1 barrel per day for water. The water:gas ratio ranges from 0.1 to 10 barrels per million standard cubic feet, indicating that free water is produced along with water dissolved in gas in the reservoir. Oil in the Bluebell-Altamont Field in the Uinta Basin and gas in the Piceance Creek Field in the Piceance Basin are produced from the Wasatch Formation.

As of May 2019, tight gas from the Wasatch Formation and underlying Mesaverde Group has been produced more than 1.76 trillion cubic feet (TCF) of gas from over 3,000 wells in the Uinta Basin, mostly from the Natural Buttes gas field in the eastern part of the basin. In the Piceance Basin, the Mesaverde Group and Wasatch Formation produced more than 7.7 TCF from over 12,000 wells, mostly from the central part of the basin.

Mining

Coal 
Coal is mined from the Wasatch Formation in Wyoming. Together with the Fort Union Formation, the Wasatch Formation represents the thickest coal bed deposits in the state.

Uranium 

The fluvial sandstones contain uranium roll front deposits. The formation is the main producer of uranium in the state. Ore zones contain uraninite and pyrite. Oxidized ores include uranophane, meta-autunite, and phosphuranylite.

Wasatchian correlations

See also 

 List of fossiliferous stratigraphic units in Colorado
 List of fossiliferous stratigraphic units in Wyoming
 List of fossiliferous stratigraphic units in Utah
 Paleontology in Colorado
 Paleontology in Utah
 Paleontology in Wyoming
 2014 West Salt Creek landslide

References

Bibliography

Wasatch publications

Geology publications

Maps 
State maps
 
 

Quadrangle maps
 
 
 
 

Other maps

Paleontology publications 

 
 
 
 
 
 
 
 
 
 
 
 
 
 
 
 
 
 
 
 
 
 
 
 
 
 
 
 
 
 
 
 
 
 
 
 
 
 
 
 
 
 
 
 
 
 
 
 
 
 
 
 
 
 
 
 
 
 
 
 
 
 
 
 
 
 
 
 
 
 
 
 
 
 
 
 

Geologic formations of the United States
Geologic formations of Colorado
Geologic formations of Idaho
Geologic formations of Montana
Geologic formations of Utah
Geologic formations of Wyoming
Eocene Series of North America
Paleogene Colorado
Paleogene Idaho
Paleogene Montana
Paleogene geology of Utah
Paleogene geology of Wyoming
 
Bridgerian
Clarkforkian
Ypresian Stage
Sandstone formations of the United States
Conglomerate formations
Mudstone formations
Siltstone formations
Shale formations of the United States
Coal formations
Coal in the United States
Alluvial deposits
Fluvial deposits
Lacustrine deposits
Ichnofossiliferous formations
Reservoir rock formations
Source rock formations
Unconventional gas
Fossiliferous stratigraphic units of North America
Paleontology in Colorado
Paleontology in Utah
Paleontology in Wyoming
Shoshone